Pileanthus filifolius, commonly known as summer coppercups, is a plant species of the family Myrtaceae endemic to Western Australia.

It blooms between  November and January producing pink-red flowers.

It is found on sand plains in the Mid West, Wheatbelt and Swan Coastal Plain regions of Western Australia between Northampton and Gingin where it grows in sandy soils over laterite.

References

filifolius
Endemic flora of Western Australia
Myrtales of Australia
Rosids of Western Australia
Taxa named by Carl Meissner
Plants described in 1857